Rosa Liksom (born Anni Ylävaara, Ylitornio, 7 January 1958) is a Finnish writer and artist. She studied anthropology and social sciences at the universities of Helsinki, Copenhagen and Moscow. She won the J. H. Erkko Award in 1985 for her debut novel Yhden yön pysäkki and the Finlandia Prize in 2011 for Hytti nro 6. Of these, the 2021 film version based on Hytti nro 6 was selected to compete for the Palme d'Or at the 2021 Cannes Film Festival, and it won the Grand Prix. In 2016, the French government appointed Liksom a Chevalier (Knight) of the Ordre des Arts et des Lettres.

Works

Short stories 
 Yhden yön pysäkki, 1985
 Unohdettu vartti, 1986
 Väliasema Gagarin, 1987
 Go Moskova go, 1988
 Tyhjän tien paratiisit, 1989
 Bamalama, 1993
 Perhe, 2000
 Maa, 2006

Novels 
 Kreisland, Helsinki 1996
 Reitari, Helsinki 2002
 Hytti nro 6, Helsinki 2011
 Väliaikainen, Helsinki: Like, 2014. .
 Burka, Helsinki: Like, 2014. .
 Everstinna, Helsinki: Like, 2017. .
 Väylä, Helsinki: Like, 2021. .

Children's books 
 Jepata Nastan lentomatka, 2002
 Tivoli Tähtisade 2004

References 

 Rosa Liksom - (Finnish) - WSOY
 Rosa Liksom

External links 
 Home page

 Rosa Liksom in 375 humanists – 3 May 2015. Faculty of Arts, University of Helsinki.

1958 births
Living people
People from Ylitornio
Writers from Lapland (Finland)
Finnish women short story writers
Finnish short story writers
Finnish women novelists
Finnish children's writers
Finnish comics artists
Finnish women children's writers
Articles containing video clips
Finnish female comics artists